In English folklore, Puck,  also known as Robin Goodfellow, is a domestic and nature sprite, demon, or fairy.

Origins and comparative folklore

Etymology
The etymology of puck is uncertain. Similar words are attested later in Old Norse (with related forms including Old Swedish , Icelandic , and Frisian ) but also in the Celtic languages (Welsh , Cornish  and Irish ). Most commentators think that the word was borrowed from one of these neighbouring north-west European languages into the others, but it is not certain in what direction the borrowing went, and all vectors have been proposed by scholars. The Oxford English Dictionary favoured a Scandinavian origin, while the scholarly study by Erin Sebo of Flinders University argues for an Irish origin, on the basis that the word is widely distributed in Irish place-names, whereas puck-place-names in English are rare and late in the areas showing Old Norse influence, and seem rather to radiate outwards from the south-west of England, which she argues had Irish influence during the early medieval period.

Alternative names
Puck may also be called Robin Goodfellow or Hobgoblin, in which Hob may substitute for Rob or Robin. The name Robin is Middle English in origin, deriving from Old French , the pet form for the name Robert. Similar to the use of "the good folk" in describing fairies, it reflected a degree of wishful thinking and an attempt to appease the fairies, recognizing their fondness of flattery despite their mischievous nature.

The earliest reference to "Robin Goodfellow" cited by the Oxford English Dictionary is from 1531.  Anthony Munday mentions Robin Goodfellow in his play The Two Italian Gentlemen, 1584, and he appears in Skialtheia, or a Shadowe of Truth in 1598. William Shakespeare may have had access to the manuscript of Lewes Lewkenor's translation of The Spanish Mandevile of Miracles, or, The Garden of Curious Flowers (1600), a translation of Antonio de Torquemada's . The following passage from The Spanish Mandeville discusses the mischievous spirits:

After Meyerbeer's successful opera Robert le Diable (1831), neo-medievalists and occultists began to apply the name Robin Goodfellow to the Devil, with appropriately extravagant imagery.

Characteristics

According to Brewer's Dictionary of Phrase and Fable (1898):

Puck might do minor housework, quick fine needlework or butter-churning, which could be undone in a moment by his knavish tricks if displeased. A domestic spirit, he would assist housewives with their chores, in expectation of an offering of white bread and milk. If this were neglected he would steal that which he believed was owed.

Pucks are also known to be inherently solitary creatures. Shakespeare's characterization of "shrewd and knavish" Puck in A Midsummer Night's Dream may have revived flagging interest in Puck.

Notable cultural references

16th–17th century
 The character Puck, also referred to as Robin Goodfellow and Hobgoblin, appears as a vassal of the Fairy King Oberon in William Shakespeare's 1595/96 play A Midsummer Night's Dream, and is responsible for the mischief that occurs.
 The character also appears in Grim the Collier of Croydon (1660, but perhaps based on an earlier play). It is unknown how Shakespeare's Puck appeared on the stage; but the figure in Grim was costumed "in a suit of leather close to his body; his face and hands coloured russet-coloured, with a flail."
 A Robin Goodfellow play was performed at Hampton Court on 1 January 1604, followed by The Masque of Indian and China Knights.
 An early 17th century broadside ballad The Mad Merry Pranks of Robin Goodfellow describes the character as the emissary of Oberon, the Fairy King of the Night, inspiring night-terrors in old women but also carding their wool while they sleep, leading travellers astray, taking the shape of animals, blowing out the candles to kiss the girls in the darkness, twitching off their bedclothes, or making them fall out of bed on the cold floor, tattling secrets, and changing babes in cradles with elflings.
 Robin Goodfellow is the main speaker in Jonson's 1612 masque Love Restored.
 John Milton, in L'Allegro tells "how the drudging Goblin swet / To earn his cream-bowle" by threshing a week's worth of grain in a night, and then, "Basks at the fire his hairy strength." Milton's Puck is not small and sprightly, but nearer to a Green Man or a hairy woodwose. An illustration of Robin Goodfellow from 1639 represents the influence of Pan imagery giving Puck the hindquarters, cloven hooves and horns of a goat.

19th century

 Robin Goodfellow appears in 'The Mad Pranks of Robin Goodfellow', Gammer Gurton's Pleasant Stories of Patient Grissel, The Princess Rosetta, & Robin Goodfellow, and Ballads of the Beggar's Daughter, The Babes in the Wood, and Fair Rosamond, 1845.
Robin Goodfellow appears in an 1856 speech by Karl Marx: "In the signs that bewilder the middle class, the aristocracy and the poor profits of regression, we recognize our brave friend Robin Goodfellow, the old mole that can work the earth so fast, that worthy pioneer – the Revolution."

20th century
 The character of Puck frames the tales in Rudyard Kipling's short story cycles Puck of Pook's Hill (1906) and Rewards and Fairies (1910).
 Dear Brutus is a 1917 fantasy play by J. M. Barrie, the host "Lob" is the aged Puck from A Midsummer Night's Dream
 The 1976 play Robin Goodfellow by Aurand Harris retells A Midsummer Night's Dream from Puck's point of view.
 The 1989 Manga series Berserk written and illustrated by Kentaro Miura. Set in a medieval Europe-inspired dark fantasy world features a character named Puck (パック, Pakku) who resembles a small fairy or pixie like creature (though he is technically an elf).
 In the Disney cartoon Gargoyles, Puck is one of several Shakespearean characters with recurring roles. He is something of an antagonist, but his mischief can also help the heroes.

21st century
 Puck is also a major character in Michael Buckley's 2005–2012 book series The Sisters Grimm.
 Puck (Robin Goodfellow) is a character in Rob Thurman's Cal Leandros series of novels (2006–).
 Puck is a main character in Julie Kagawa's 2010–2015 The Iron Fey Series, along with other characters from A Midsummer Night's Dream. Puck is also the main protagonist in Kagawa's The Iron Raven (2021), the first book in The Iron Fey: Evenfall series.
 Puck is a major character in Chris Adrian's 2011 novel The Great Night.
 In the 2019 Amazon series Carnival Row, the Puck are a race of fae.
 Puck (also known as Robin Goodfellow) joins the series The Chilling Adventures of Sabrina in its third and fourth seasons (2019–2020).
 Puck also appears as a character in the God of War video games, synthesized with the character of Mímir from Norse Mythology. In these games, he is voiced by actor Alastair Duncan.
Puck is a hero in the Dota 2 video game.

See also
 Puck (A Midsummer Night's Dream)
 Puck (other uses)
 Niß Puk (also Nis Puk), a being from Danish-German folklore which also might be referred to as Puck

References

English folklore
English legendary characters
English legendary creatures
European legendary creatures
New Forest folklore
Fictional jesters
Germanic legendary creatures
Medieval legends
Supernatural legends
Household deities
Sprites (folklore)
Hobgoblins